Suzy Welch (born 1959) is an American author, television commentator, business journalist, and public speaker. Her 2009 book, 10-10-10: A Life Transforming Idea, was a New York Times bestseller. She is also the co-author, with her late husband Jack Welch, of two international New York Times and Wall Street Journal best-selling business books, Winning, published in 2005, and The Real Life MBA, published in 2015.

Early life and education
In 1959, Welch was born as Suzanne Spring in Portland, Oregon. Welch's parents are Phyllis and Bernard Spring. She was primarily raised in New York and New England. Her father is an architect and architectural school administrator. Welch attended Phillips Exeter Academy, Harvard and Radcliffe College, and Harvard Business School, from which she graduated as a Baker Scholar, in the top five percent of her class.

Career
Welch started her career as a reporter with the Miami Herald and then with the Associated Press. After business school, she worked for several years at Bain & Company, a management consulting firm based in Boston. She was later named editor-in-chief of the Harvard Business Review. She has written a novel, and authored and edited numerous books and articles dealing with leadership, organizational change, and human resource management.

In early 2002, Welch was forced to resign from the Harvard Business Review after admitting to an affair with the then-married Jack Welch, the former chief executive officer of General Electric, while preparing an interview with him for the magazine. The affair was brought to the attention of the Review by Jane Welch, Welch's wife at the time. Jack Welch and Jane Welch divorced and he then married Suzy Welch. Suzy Welch had the interview pulled before it appeared in the Business Review.

Together with her husband, Jack Welch, Suzy has co-authored several best-selling books including, Winning, its companion volume, Winning: The Answers, and, most recently, The Real Life MBA: Your No-BS Guide to Winning the Game, Building a Team and Growing Your Career. Jack and Suzy also wrote "The Welch Way", a weekly column on business and career challenges that appeared in BusinessWeek magazine from 2005 to 2009 and was published in 45 newspapers across the world by The New York Times Syndicate. Together, they also founded Jack Welch Management Institute, an online MBA program.

She has written about work–life balance and other cultural issues for publications including O, The Oprah Magazine and The Wall Street Journal. In addition, she has been a commentator on television programs including Good Morning America, The View, Morning Joe, Your World With Neil Cavuto, and Power Lunch. Her career expertise and perceptive commentary have made her a regular contributor on The TODAY Show and Bulls & Bears.

Welch is a well-known public speaker represented by CAA. She moderated SXSW's Q&A session between legendary business leader and husband, Jack Welch and venture capitalist Gary Vaynerchuk.

Philanthropy 
All proceeds from the Welchs' books are donated to fund scholarships for low-income students. Suzy and Jack have donated over $8 million to the University of Massachusetts, primarily through the John and Grace Welch Scholarship fund for Salem High School students.

In 2015, Suzy Welch was elected to the board of directors of The Humane Society of the United States.

Personal life
Welch is formerly known as Suzy Wetlaufer. 
Welch is the mother of four adult children (from her previous marriage). She married Jack Welch, former CEO of General Electric, in 2004, after meeting him in October 2001.

References

External links

1959 births
Living people
Phillips Exeter Academy alumni
Harvard Business School alumni
People from Lexington, Massachusetts
Journalists from Massachusetts
American business and financial journalists
American women journalists
20th-century American journalists
20th-century American women writers
21st-century American journalists
21st-century American women writers
Miami Herald people
Associated Press reporters
People from North Palm Beach, Florida
Women business and financial journalists
Radcliffe College alumni